Bar Kokhba Sextet brings together six core members of Masada under the leadership of John Zorn. The music act is an improvisational group from New York's best downtown artists, including Cyro Baptista on percussion, Marc Ribot on guitar, Greg Cohen on bass, Joey Baron on drums and Mark Feldman, and Erik Friedlander on strings. According to Tzadik, John Zorn's music label; the band's music is "Sephardic exotica for young moderns".

The Bar Kokhba album recorded between 1994 & 1996 together with the Masada musical project was the album that started John Zorn's 2nd evolution into Masada Book Two (II) or Book of Angels during the Winter of 2005 at Tonic (New York City) after performing a ravishing set of sessions of film-works at the Anthology Film Archives in the same city during the Winter of 2004.

Discography
1998 - The Circle Maker - Disc Two: Zevulun
2005 - 50th Birthday Celebration Volume 11
2008 - Lucifer: Book of Angels Volume 10

External links

References 

Tzadik Records artists
John Zorn